Ameroseius sextuberculi is a species of mite in the family Ameroseiidae.

References

Ameroseiidae
Articles created by Qbugbot
Animals described in 1996
Taxa named by Wolfgang Karg